Adolphus Busch Hall is a Harvard University building located at 27 Kirkland Street in Cambridge, Massachusetts. It is named for brewer and philanthropist Adolphus Busch, former president of the Anheuser-Busch company, who contributed $265,000 to its building fund.

The hall was designed by architect German Bestelmeyer to house Harvard's Germanic Museum. Its cornerstone was laid in 1912 and the building completed in 1917, but it was not opened to the public until 1921, officially because of a lack of coal.

The Germanic Museum evolved into the Busch-Reisinger Museum, the only museum in North America dedicated to the study of art from the German-speaking countries of Central and Northern Europe. The Busch-Reisinger was located in Adolphus Busch Hall from 1921-1991 and the hall continues to house the Busch-Reisinger's founding collection of medieval plaster casts, as well as an exhibition on the history of the museum. 

The hall also hosts concerts on its Flentrop pipe organ, which was made famous by organist E. Power Biggs, who broadcast and recorded his long-playing records there.

The hall is also home to Harvard's Minda de Gunzberg Center for European Studies. Its courtyard contains a copy of the Brunswick Lion.

See also

Harvard Art Museums
Busch-Reisinger Museum

References

External links

 Harvard Art Museums website
 Harvard Art Museums Collection Search website
 Harvard University website
Busch-Reisinger marks a century

Harvard University buildings
Landmarks in Cambridge, Massachusetts
School buildings completed in 1917
1917 establishments in Massachusetts